The National Confederation of Central African Workers is a trade union centre in the Central African Republic.

It is affiliated with the International Trade Union Confederation.

References

Trade unions in the Central African Republic
International Trade Union Confederation